Yen Tzung-ta is a Taiwanese economist and the current Deputy Governor of the Central Bank of the Republic of China since February 2012.

Education
Yen obtained his bachelor's degree in economics from Tunghai University in 1978, master's degree in economics from National Chengchi University in 1980 and doctoral degree in economics from Michigan State University in the United States in 1989.

Early careers
Yen was the assistant director-general of the department of economic research off the Central Bank of the Republic of China in April 1993 until January 2004. He then became the adviser of the Central Bank in January 2004 until October 2006. In October 2006 until March 2008, he became the deputy director-general of the department of economic research of the Central Bank. Lastly, he became the director-general of the department of economic research of the Central Bank in March 2008 until February 2012.

References

1956 births
Living people
20th-century Taiwanese economists
Central bankers
Tunghai University alumni
National Chengchi University alumni
Michigan State University alumni
21st-century Taiwanese economists